This article contains a list of National Monuments of Zimbabwe as defined by the National Museums and Monuments of Zimbabwe

References

Zimbabwean culture
Zimb